Goshainganj railway station is a railway station between Lucknow and Varanasi railway route in Goshainganj, Faizabad district (now Ayodhya district), Uttar Pradesh, India.

Services
There are about 31 trains which pass via Goshainganj out of which following 20 trains halt here.

 Varanasi–Bareilly Express (14235/14236)
 Utsarg Express (18191/18192)
 Doon Express (13009/13010)
 Farakka Express (via Sultanpur) (13483/13484)
 Ganga Sutlej Express (13307/13308)
 Kolkata–Jammu Tawi Express (13151/13152)
 Ahmedabad–Darbhanga Sabarmati Express (19165/19166)
 Ahmedabad–Varanasi Sabarmati Express (19167/19168)
 Sadbhavna Express (via Faizabad) (14017/14018)
 14853/Marudhar Express (via Faizabad) – Varanasi/BSB to Jodhpur

See also
 
 
 
 Lucknow Charbagh railway station

References

Railway stations in Faizabad district
Lucknow NR railway division
Railway stations opened in 1873